The Treatise on Tea is a book written by the Chinese Emperor Huizong of the Song dynasty in 1107.

Emperor Huizong was a great connoisseur of tea, with masterful skill in the art of tea ceremony. He often engaged in tea tasting and tea competitions with his subordinates at the Song imperial court. Emperor Huizong's favourite was Anji Bai Cha. (He wrote that what he loved was "Bai Cha." This should not be confused with the tea currently known as "White Tea," but was rather "a Green Tea which had the color of white jade".) In the Treatise on Tea, Emperor Huizong provided the most detailed, vivid and masterful description of the Song dynasty technique of tea spotting. The Emperor also laid down seven criteria for Tea Competitions (Doucha 闘茶).

The Treatise on Tea is a key document for understanding the most sophisticated tea ceremony in Chinese history. It stands as the monumental treatise on tea after Lu Yu's The Classic of Tea (c. 760–780).

Contents
 Preface 茶論
 Locale 地產
 Season & Weather 天時
 Picking & Selection 采擇
 Steaming and Pressing 蒸壓
 Tea Making (Manufacture) 制造
 Appraising Tea 鑒辯
 White Tea 白茶
 Grinders and Sieves 羅碾
 Tea Bowls 盞
 Bamboo Whisk 筅
 Water Vase 瓶
 Ladle 構
 Water	水
 Dian; Preparing and Whisking the Tea 點
 Flavour 味
 Fragrance 香
 Colour 色
 Drying & Storage 藏焙
 Famous Teas 品名
 The Private Sector 外焙

References

Notes

External links
English translation with translator's notes - Global Tea Hut magazine, April 2016 issue, page 35

1107 works
1100s books
12th-century Chinese books
Chinese tea classic texts
Song dynasty literature
Emperor Huizong of Song
Treatises